Ben Brewster (born March 29, 1992) is an American professional soccer player and coach who most recently played as a defender for San Francisco City FC. Brewster is currently Associate Head Coach for the UMass men's soccer team. Brewster graduated from Cape Elizabeth High School in 2010, where he was also a standout lacrosse player, and from Bowdoin College in 2015.

Career

Early career
Brewster played college soccer at Bowdoin College between 2011 and 2014, where he was named the NESCAC Rookie of the Year following his freshman season, earned second team All-Conference honors after his sophomore year and first team All-Conference honors after each of his final two seasons. Brewster was also named First Team All-New England following his junior and senior seasons. Brewster was named a First Team All-American his senior year by the National Soccer Coaches Association of America. He also played lacrosse at Bowdoin, earning honorable mention All-American honors his senior year.

Brewster also appeared for USL PDL club Seacoast United Phantoms in 2013 and 2014.

Professional
Brewster signed with United Soccer League club Tulsa Roughnecks in February 2015.

Coaching
Brewster joined the UMass Minutemen coaching staff prior to the 2017 season as an assistant coach. In 2019, he was promoted to Associate Head Coach.

References

External links 
 Tulsa Roughnecks profile

1992 births
Living people
Bowdoin Polar Bears men's soccer players
Seacoast United Phantoms players
FC Tulsa players
Association football defenders
Soccer players from Maine
USL League Two players
USL Championship players
People from Cape Elizabeth, Maine
American soccer players